Tudor Royal Progresses were an important way to for the Tudor monarchs to consolidate their rule throughout England. Following his victory at the Battle of Bosworth in August 1485, the first Tudor monarch, Henry VII, ensured his coronation  (November 1485), called a parliament (November 1485), married Elizabeth of York (January 1486) – all in London before embarking on his first Royal Progress in March 1486. The last Tudor Royal Progress took place in summer 1602, as Elizabeth I, the last Tudor monarch died in March 1603.

References

Tudor England